Michael Tracey (born August 8, 1988) is an American political commentator.

Career 
Tracey has been a recurring guest on the Fox News show Tucker Carlson Tonight.

Tracey joined The Young Turks in January 2017 but left the organization by mid-2018.

In June 2017, congresswoman Maxine Waters walked away from an interview with Tracey and pushed aside his hand and microphone. The incident was captured on video. Tracey said that Waters had "initiated unwarranted physical contact" and "shoved" him, but that it was "not a violent shove".

In 2021, The Daily Dot described Tracey as an "independent journalist [who] is best known for his contrarian remarks on Twitter."

Political views 
Tracey supported Bernie Sanders in the 2016 Democratic primaries and advocated "conscious abstention" in the 2016 presidential election. He has been highly critical of Bill and Hillary Clinton. In 2020, he supported Tulsi Gabbard's presidential campaign.

Tracey has been critical of the Democratic Party and of allegations of collusion between Donald Trump and Russia.

In 2019, Tracey criticized an article by Kevin Poulsen in The Daily Beast, which revealed the identity and criminal history of a man who had allegedly created a modified video of House Speaker Nancy Pelosi that made her appear drunk.

In 2021, The Daily Dot reported that Tracey "has been referred to by some as a 'Left Heretic,' a term used for self-described liberals who oppose, among other things, what they deem to be 'identity politics'", and that "Tracey's writings in recent years have appeared largely in right-wing outlets."

In April 2022, Tracey dismissed photo evidence of the Bucha massacre as "war propaganda" and questioned its authenticity.

Personal life 
Raised in West Caldwell, New Jersey, he graduated from James Caldwell High School in 2006. He has resided in Jersey City, New Jersey.

In February 2009, Tracey was arrested while a student at The College of New Jersey after he attempted to approach Ann Coulter, who had spoken at the college's campus in Ewing. He was charged with disorderly conduct and pleaded guilty to "violating a nuisance ordinance".

References

External links 
 

1988 births
Living people
American male journalists
James Caldwell High School alumni
Journalists from New Jersey
People from West Caldwell, New Jersey
The Young Turks people